Chlorida is a genus of beetles in the family Cerambycidae, containing the following species:

Adult males of Chlorida festiva and Chlorida costata produce (6E,8Z)-6,8-pentadecadienal, an attractant pheromone.

Species

 Chlorida cincta Guérin-Méneville, 1844
 Chlorida costata Audinet-Serville, 1834
 Chlorida curta Thomson, 1857
 Chlorida denticulata Buquet, 1860
 Chlorida fasciata Bates, 1870
 Chlorida festiva (Linnaeus, 1758)
 Chlorida inexpectata Martins, Galileo & Oliveira, 2011
 Chlorida obliqua Buquet, 1852
 Chlorida spinosa Aurivillius, 1887
 Chlorida transversalis Buquet in Guérin-Méneville, 1844

References

Bothriospilini
Cerambycidae genera
Taxa named by Jean Guillaume Audinet-Serville
Taxa described in 1834